Calophyllum parvifolium is a species of flowering plant in the Calophyllaceae family. It is found only in Indonesia.

References

parvifolium
Trees of the Maluku Islands
Flora of Western New Guinea
Vulnerable plants
Taxonomy articles created by Polbot
Taxa named by Jacques Denys Choisy